In geometry, the Fulton–MacPherson compactification of the configuration space of n distinct labeled points in a compact complex manifold is a compact complex manifold that contains the configuration space as an open dense subset and is constructed in a canonical way. The notion was introduced by Fulton and MacPherson in 1994.

References 

Lecture 13: the Fulton–MacPherson compactification by A. Voronov.
W. Fulton and R. MacPherson, Compactification of configuration spaces, Annals of Mathematics 139 (1994), 183–225.

Compactification (mathematics)